Alicia Gardiner is an Australian actress who is best known from her role on television series Offspring as Kim Akerholt. Her previous roles include the television series Last Man Standing, mini-series Queen Kat, Carmel and St. Jude, Wolf Creek, Redfern Now, Kath And Kim and the children's television series Fergus McPhail and Noah & Saskia.

Gardiner studied at the Victorian College of the Arts.

In 2017 and 2018, Gardiner played the role of 'Rosie' in the Australian tour of Mamma Mia! the musical. In 2001 and 2002, Gardiner was a member of the original Australian cast of Mamma Mia!, playing the role of 'Ali'.

References

External links 
 

Australian film actresses
Australian television actresses
Living people
Victorian College of the Arts alumni
20th-century Australian actresses
21st-century Australian actresses
Year of birth missing (living people)